Kostadinović is a Serbo-Croatian surname, a patronymic derived from Kostadin (Constantine). It may refer to:
 Miloš Kostadinović (born 1988), Serbian handballer
 Petar Kostadinović (born 1992), Croatian-Italian footballer

See also
Kostandinović
Konstantinović

Croatian surnames
Serbian surnames
Patronymic surnames
Surnames from given names